In The Next Room  is a 1930 American pre-Code mystery film released by First National Pictures, a subsidiary of Warner Bros. and directed by Edward F. Cline. The movie stars Jack Mulhall and Alice Day. The film was based on the play of the same title by Eleanor Belmont and Harriet Ford, which itself was derived from the book The Mystery of the Boule Cabinet by Burton E. Stevenson.

Cast
Jack Mulhall as James Godfrey
Alice Day as Lorna
Robert Emmett O'Connor as Tim Morel
John St. Polis as Philip Vantine
Claud Allister as Parks (the butler)
Aggie Herring as Mrs. O'Connor
DeWitt Jennings as Inspector Grady
Webster Campbell as Snitzer
Lucien Prival as French Exporter

Synopsis
The story starts with a prologue set in 1889 in which we see an angry husband murdering his wife's lover. The setting then moves to 1929, just as an antiques dealer Philip Vantine (John St. Polis) has finished moving into the same house where the 1889 murder occurred.

For years the house had one occupant: the butler (Alister). Vantine moves in with his daughter Lorna (Day) and maid and retains the elderly butler to help take care of the house. One night, the police arrive at the house after receiving a telephone call that a murder has just been committed on the premises. When they arrive, the police are surprised to find that no one in the house knows what they are talking about. That same day a valuable antique cabinet arrived at the house, and this has attracted several strangers to come to examine it.

A young reporter, James Godfrey (Mulhall), who has come to see Lorna, also arrives at the house. As the police are investigating the mysterious telephone call, a series of strange events occur. As Godfrey is helping Lorna to open the antique cabinet, they find a hypnotized woman inside. The police are then notified. When everyone returns to the cabinet they find the woman has disappeared. One of the detectives, Tim Morel (O'Connor), is knocked unconscious. Vantine is also hit on the head, but stays conscious. The son of the former owner of the cabinet is soon found murdered.

As Godfrey attempts to call his newspaper, Lorna is abducted and taken to the wine cellar. She is rescued by a one-legged man who suddenly disappears. Meanwhile, the hypnotized girl appears in a revived state and reveals that her partner, a diamond smuggler, has been murdered with poison. Eventually, Godfrey, assuming the role of an amateur detective, clears up the mystery.

Preservation status
No film elements are known to survive. The soundtrack, which was recorded on Vitaphone disks, may survive in private hands.

See also
List of lost films

References

External links

American black-and-white films
American mystery films
Films directed by Edward F. Cline
First National Pictures films
Lost American films
Warner Bros. films
1930 mystery films
1930 lost films
1930s English-language films
1930s American films